Grant Gore (born 21 November 1991) is a rugby league footballer who plays for the Swinton Lions in the Kingstone Press Championship.

He started his career at Widnes, and made his début in 2011 in a Northern Rail Cup match against London Skolars.

He has previously played for Whitehaven.

References

External links
Whitehaven profile
 Profile at rugby.widnes.tv

1991 births
Living people
English rugby league players
Rugby league halfbacks
Swinton Lions players
Whitehaven R.L.F.C. players
Widnes Vikings players